Viniani is a village and a former municipality in Evrytania, Greece. Since the 2011 local government reform it is part of the municipality Agrafa, of which it is a municipal unit. The municipal unit has an area of 152.729 km2. Population 967 (2011). The seat of the municipality was in Kerasochori.

References

Populated places in Evrytania